Morecambe is a seaside town in Lancashire, England.

Morecambe may also refer to:

Places

England
Morecambe Bay, a large estuary in northwest England
Morecambe railway station
Morecambe Promenade railway station, former railway station

Canada
Morecambe, Alberta, a hamlet

People
Eric Morecambe (1926–1984), English comedian
Morecambe and Wise, an English comic double act

Other
Morecambe F.C., a football team based in Morecambe, Lancashire, England
Morecambe FC Women, a women's football team based in Morecambe, Lancashire, England
Morecambe (play), based on the life of Eric Morecambe

See also
Morecambe and Lunesdale (UK Parliament constituency)